Sena locally known as Sana or Sanaw (Yemeni Arabic: سنا\سنو, Romanised: Sanā/Sanāw, IPA: [sˤɑnaːʔ] or [sˤɑnaːw]), is an abandoned ancient town in Yemen located in the remote eastern Hadramaut valley. This village is distinct from the capital of Yemen, San'a (Arabic),  and the town of Sanāw in Oman.

The locality of Sena is frequently mentioned in the history of the Lemba people; who patrilineally primarily descend from Ancient Semitic traders who migrated into Africa and intermarried with Bantu women somewhere along the Swahili Coast, whom then migrated both interolaterally and southwards into Southern Africa.

References

Ancient cities of the Middle East
Populated places in Hadhramaut Governorate
Former populated places in Yemen
Historic Jewish communities in Asia
Jews and Judaism in Yemen